Boholano is a variant of the Cebuano language spoken in the island province of Bohol in the Visayas and a major portion of Southern Leyte, as well as parts of Mindanao, particularly in Northern Mindanao and Caraga. It is sometimes erroneously described as a separate language even though Binol-anon originated as a dialect continuum of the Cebuano language.

Boholano, especially as spoken in central Bohol, can be distinguished from other Cebuano variants by a few phonetic changes:
The semivowel y is pronounced  as is the ll sound (similar to Spanish Yeísmo):  is pronounced ;

History

The Bohol dialect developed in the region after the Cebuano language arrived there from Cebu. The Cebuano language, descended from Proto-Austronesian (ca. 6000 years ago), originated in the Sugbo heartland and then "has spread from its base in Cebu" to Bohol, thus beginning the Bohol Cebuano dialect.

References

External links
The Boholano Language
Boholano

Cebuano dialects
Languages of Bohol